Elizabeth Jamaux Curnow (née Le Cren; 31 October 1911 – 24 September 2005), commonly known as Betty Curnow, was a New Zealand artist.

Background 
Born in Timaru, New Zealand, Curnow was the daughter of Charles John Le Cren and Daisy Le Cren (née Roberts). Daisy was also an artist, painting watercolours.  She married Allen Curnow at St Mary's Church, Timaru, on 26 August 1936. The marriage was dissolved in 1965, but they had a daughter and two sons, one of whom is New Zealand poet and art critic Wystan Curnow. Curnow died in Geraldine, New Zealand, in 2005.

Career 
Curnow was a painter and printmaker. She exhibited with the New Zealand Academy of Fine Arts, and 'The Group' in 1964

She is depicted in her close friend Rita Angus' painting, Portrait of Betty Curnow. Curnow and Angus collaborated on the painting, selected clothing and objects that would best symbolise the threads of Curnow's life as a daughter, wife and mother. The work also inspired Louise Henderson's Portrait of Betty Curnow.

Works by Curnow are held in the Auckland Art Gallery Toi o Tāmaki.

References

Further reading 
Artist files for Curnow are held at:
 E. H. McCormick Research Library, Auckland Art Gallery Toi o Tāmaki
 Robert and Barbara Stewart Library and Archives, Christchurch Art Gallery Te Puna o Waiwhetu
 Fine Arts Library, University of Auckland
 Hocken Collections Uare Taoka o Hākena
 Te Aka Matua Research Library, Museum of New Zealand Te Papa Tongarewa
Also see:
 Concise Dictionary of New Zealand Artists McGahey, Kate (2000) Gilt Edge
 Prints and Printmakers in New Zealand Peter Cape (1974) Collins

1911 births
2005 deaths
People from Timaru
New Zealand women painters
20th-century New Zealand painters
People associated with The Group (New Zealand art)